For complementary sequences in biology, see complementarity (molecular biology). For integer sequences with complementary sets of members see Lambek–Moser theorem.
In applied mathematics, complementary sequences (CS) are pairs of sequences with the useful property that their out-of-phase aperiodic autocorrelation coefficients sum to zero. Binary complementary sequences were first introduced by Marcel J. E. Golay in 1949. In 1961–1962 Golay gave several methods for constructing sequences of length 2N and gave examples of complementary sequences of lengths 10 and 26.  In 1974 R. J. Turyn gave a method for constructing sequences of length mn from sequences of lengths m and n which allows the construction of sequences of any length of the form 2N10K26M.

Later the theory of complementary sequences was generalized by other authors to polyphase complementary sequences, multilevel complementary sequences, and arbitrary complex complementary sequences. Complementary sets have also been considered; these can contain more than two sequences.

Definition 

Let (a0, a1, ..., aN − 1) and (b0, b1, ..., bN − 1) be a pair of bipolar sequences, meaning that a(k) and b(k) have values +1 or −1. Let the aperiodic autocorrelation function of the sequence x be defined by

Then the pair of sequences a and b is complementary if:

for k = 0, and 

for k = 1, ..., N − 1.

Or using Kronecker delta we can write:

So we can say that the sum of autocorrelation functions of complementary sequences is a delta function, which is an ideal autocorrelation for many applications like radar pulse compression and spread spectrum telecommunications.

Examples 

 As the simplest example we have sequences of length 2: (+1, +1) and (+1, −1). Their autocorrelation functions are (2, 1) and (2, −1), which add up to (4, 0).
 As the next example (sequences of length 4), we have (+1, +1, +1, −1) and (+1, +1, −1, +1). Their autocorrelation functions are (4, 1, 0, −1) and (4, −1, 0, 1), which add up to (8, 0, 0, 0).
 One example of length 8 is (+1, +1, +1, −1, +1, +1, −1, +1) and (+1, +1, +1, −1, −1, −1, +1, −1). Their autocorrelation functions are (8, −1, 0, 3, 0, 1, 0, 1) and (8, 1, 0, −3, 0, −1, 0, −1).
 An example of length 10 given by Golay is (+1, +1, −1, +1, −1, +1, −1, −1, +1, +1) and (+1, +1, −1, +1, +1, +1, +1, +1, −1, −1). Their autocorrelation functions are (10, −3, 0, −1, 0, 1,−2, −1, 2, 1) and (10, 3, 0, 1, 0, −1, 2, 1, −2, −1).

Properties of complementary pairs of sequences 

 Complementary sequences have complementary spectra. As the autocorrelation function and the power spectra form a Fourier pair, complementary sequences also have complementary spectra. But as the Fourier transform of a delta function is a constant, we can write

 

 where CS is a constant.

 Sa and Sb are defined as a squared magnitude of the Fourier transform of the sequences.

 CS spectra is upper bounded. As Sa and Sb are non-negative values we can write

 

 also

 

 If either of the sequences of the CS pair is inverted (multiplied by −1) they remain complementary. More generally if any of the sequences is multiplied by ejφ they remain complementary;
 If either of the sequences is reversed they remain complementary;
 If either of the sequences is delayed they remain complementary;
 If the sequences are interchanged they remain complementary;
 If both sequences are multiplied by the same constant (real or complex) they remain complementary;
 If both sequences are decimated in time by K they remain complementary. More precisely if from a complementary pair (a(k), b(k)) we form a new pair (a(Nk), b(Nk)) with skipped samples discarded then the new sequences are complementary.
 If alternating bits of both sequences are inverted they remain complementary. In general for arbitrary complex sequences if both sequences are multiplied by ejπkn/N (where k is a constant and n is the time index) they remain complementary;
 A new pair of complementary sequences can be formed as [a b] and [a −b] where [..] denotes concatenation and a and b are a pair of CS;
 A new pair of sequences can be formed as {a b} and {a −b} where {..} denotes interleaving of sequences.
 A new pair of sequences can be formed as a + b and a − b.

Golay pair
A complementary pair a, b may be encoded as polynomials A(z) = a(0) + a(1)z + ... + a(N − 1)zN−1 and similarly for B(z).  The complementarity property of the sequences is equivalent to the condition

for all z on the unit circle, that is, |z| = 1.  If so, A and B form a Golay pair of polynomials.  Examples include the Shapiro polynomials, which give rise to complementary sequences of length a power of two.

Applications of complementary sequences 

 Multislit spectrometry
 Ultrasound measurements
 Acoustic measurements
 radar pulse compression
 Wi-Fi networks, 
 3G CDMA wireless networks
 OFDM communication systems
 Train wheel detection systems
 Non-destructive tests (NDT)
 Communications
 coded aperture masks are designed using a 2-dimensional generalization of complementary sequences.

See also
 Binary Golay code (Error-correcting code)
 Gold sequences
 Kasami sequences
 Polyphase sequence
 Pseudorandom binary sequences (also called maximum length sequences or M-sequences)
 Ternary Golay code (Error-correcting code)
 Walsh-Hadamard sequences
 Zadoff–Chu sequence

References 

Sequences and series
Signal processing
Pseudorandom number generators